Senad Gashi (born 20 April 1990) is a German professional boxer. At regional level, he has held multiple heavyweight championships, and challenged once for the German title in 2018.

Professional career

Early career
Gashi made his professional debut on 17 May 2014 at the Saarlandhalle in Saarbrücken, beating Czech David Liska via first-round knockout (KO). On 29 November, Gashi defeated Aldin Avdic with a first-round TKO, in Frankfurt. In Gashi's seventh fight, he defeated Serbian Dubravko Knezevic via first-round knockout. On 20 June 2015, Gashi took his record to 8–0 with a second-round stoppage victory over Montenegrin heavyweight Ratko Draskovic and winning the GBC Intercontinental heavyweight title. On 2 October 2015, Gashi beat Hungarian Andras Csomor for the vacant German International and WBC Baltic Silver heavyweight titles with a fourth-round corner retirement (RTD).
 
On 21 May 2016, in his twelfth bout, Gashi defeated Marino Goles in a first-round TKO for the vacant GBU heavyweight title. On 2 July 2016 in Nuremberg, Gashi defeated Haris Calakovic by KO in the first round.

Gashi vs. Schwarz
On 21 April 2018, Gashi competed against the also unbeaten German Tom Schwarz, for Schwarz's WBO Inter-Continental and Germany heavyweight titles. In a highly controversial fight, Gashi had several head-butts that resulted in his disqualification in Round 6 of the fight. Until then, the fight was well balanced, with Schwarz being severely beaten several times by the smaller Gashi.

On 1 December 2018, in his first fight back following the loss to Schwarz, Gashi defeated Argentinian Ruben Angel Mino by a first-round knockout, for the vacant UBF International and GBU interim Continental heavyweight titles.

Gashi vs. Takam
On 22 December 2018, Gashi faced former world title challenger Carlos Takam at the O2 Arena in London with the bout taking place on the undercard of Dillian Whyte vs. Derek Chisora II on Sky Sports Box Office. Takam knocked Gashi down three times, eventually winning the fight via TKO in round seven.

Gashi vs. Chisora
On 20 April 2019, as the co-main event to Dave Allen vs. Lucas Browne, Gashi faced former world title challenger Derek Chisora. Gashi switched southpaw from the opening bell, landing an effective counter punch in the second but Chisora connected with a good body shot in the third and took control of the fight. Chisora continued to be the aggressor throughout and won by unanimous decision with scores of 99–91, 100–90, and 100–91.
 
On 27 July 2019, Gashi defeated Ervin Dzinic by a first-round TKO, for the vacant GBF world and UBF European heavyweight titles in Tetovo. On 6 October 2019, Gashi defeated Ozcan Cetinkaya by a second-round TKO, for the vacant WBF interim and GBU interim heavyweight titles in Ljubljana.

Professional boxing record

References

External links
 

1990 births
Living people
German male boxers
Heavyweight boxers
Bridgerweight boxers